The Russian First Division 2009 was the 18th season of Russia's second-tier football league since the dissolution of the Soviet Union. The season began on 28 March 2009 and ended on 4 November 2009.

Teams
The league has been reduced from 22 to 20 teams. It features eleven clubs from Russian First Division 2008, two clubs relegated from Russian Premier League 2008, five zone winners from Russian Second Division 2008 and two of the third-placed clubs from Russian Second Division 2008.

Movement between Premier League and First Division
FC Rostov as 2008 champions and Kuban Krasnodar as runners-up have been promoted to the Premier League. They will be replaced by relegated teams Shinnik Yaroslavl and Luch-Energia Vladivostok.

Movement between First Division and Second Division
Due to the league contraction, seven instead of the regular five teams were relegated to their respective Second Division group. These teams, ranked 16th through 22nd in 2008, were Metallurg-Kuzbass Novokuznetsk, Volga Ulyanovsk, Torpedo Moscow, Mashuk-KMV Pyatigorsk, Dinamo Barnaul, Dinamo Bryansk and Zvezda Irkutsk.

The relegated teams were replaced by the five 2008 Second Division zone winners. These were MVD Rossii Moscow (West), Metallurg Lipetsk (Center), Volgar-Gazprom-2 Astrakhan (South), Volga Nizhny Novgorod (Ural-Povolzhye) and FC Chita (East).

Further team changes
Sportakademklub Moscow avoided relegation in 2008 by finishing 15th, but announced refusal to play in the First Division on 18 December 2008. On 15 January 2009, SKA Rostov-on-Don refused to play as well. Regulations provided that Sportakademclub and SKA should be replaced by two of the runners-up from the Second Division groups (FC Bataysk-2007, FC Torpedo Vladimir, FC Gazovik Orenburg, FC Avangard Kursk or FC Smena Komsomolsk-on-Amur). However, since all of those teams refused promotion, the places were eventually filled by third-place finishers FC Nizhny Novgorod and FC Krasnodar.

Overview

FC MVD Rossii resigned from the league on 17 July after playing 19 matches. The team was in the 19th position with 17 points.

Managerial changes

Standings

Results

Top scorers
Last updated: 4 November 2009; Source: PFL 
18 goals
  Aleksei Medvedev (Sibir)
17 goals
  Spartak Gogniyev (KAMAZ)
16 goals
  Vladimir Shishelov (Ural)
15 goals
  Roman Grigoryan (Vityaz)
13 goals
  Otar Martsvaladze (Anzhi)
12 goals
  Nikita Burmistrov (Shinnik)
  Serghei Dadu (Alania)
10 goals
  Anton Khazov (Volga)
9 goals
  Sergei Davydov (Volgar-Gazprom-2)
  Denys Dedechko (Luch-Energiya)
  Nicolae Josan (Anzhi)
  Vasili Karmazinenko (SKA-Energiya)

Awards
On 25 November 2009, Professional Football League announced the award winners for the season.

 Best player: Aleksei Medvedev (FC Sibir Novosibirsk).
 Best goalkeeper: Sergei Chepchugov (FC Sibir Novosibirsk).
 Best defender: Rasim Tagirbekov (FC Anzhi Makhachkala).
 Best midfielder:  Nicolae Josan (FC Anzhi Makhachkala).
 Best striker: Aleksei Medvedev.
 Best manager: Omari Tetradze (FC Anzhi Makhachkala).

See also
Russian Premier League 2009

References

External links
 PFL

2
Russian First League seasons
Russia
Russia